Surry Community College is a public community college in Dobson, North Carolina. Founded in 1964, it is part of the North Carolina Community College System and serves Surry and Yadkin Counties. It is part of the North Carolina Community College System.

Surry Community College offers thirty-six areas of study, many of which have options for an associate degree, diploma, or certificate, as well as online degrees. The college serves over 18,000 students in over 1,500 classes through their Workforce Training and Continuing Education Division. This area of the college offers a variety of learning opportunities through Workforce and Technology classes for those looking to take a one-time class for personal enrichment or to expand their knowledge base in a particular area.

In addition to its main campus in Dobson, the college operates four satellite centers:
 The Center for Public Safety in Mount Airy,
 The Elkin Center in Elkin,
 The Pilot Center in Pilot Mountain, and
 The Yadkin Center in Yadkinville.

References

External links
 

Two-year colleges in the United States
Vocational education in the United States
North Carolina Community College System colleges
Education in Surry County, North Carolina
Universities and colleges accredited by the Southern Association of Colleges and Schools
Educational institutions established in 1964
Buildings and structures in Surry County, North Carolina
Education in Yadkin County, North Carolina
1964 establishments in North Carolina
NJCAA athletics